World Class Wrestling Association (WCWA), based out of Dallas, Texas held a number of major professional wrestling super shows under the name Wrestling Star Wars between 1981 and 1989, with five of these being held in 1987.

Wrestling Star Wars (February)

Wrestling Star Wars (February 1987) was a professional wrestling supercard show that was held on February 2, 1987. The show was produced and scripted by the Dallas, Texas-based World Class Wrestling Association (WCWA) professional wrestling promotion and held in their home area, Dallas/Ft. Worth, Texas. Several matches from the show were taped for WCWA's television shows and broadcast in the weeks following the show. The show was the 27th overall show in the "Wrestling Star Wars" event chronology and was held at the Fort Worth Convention Center with an estimated 18,000 seat capacity when configured for professional wrestling shows.

Results

Labor Day Star Wars

Labor Day Star Wars (1987) was a professional wrestling supercard show that was held on September 7, 1987. The show was produced and scripted by the Dallas, Texas-based World Class Wrestling Association (WCWA) professional wrestling promotion and held in their home area, Dallas/Ft. Worth, Texas. Several matches from the show were taped for WCWA's television shows and broadcast in the weeks following the show. The show was the 28th overall show in the "Wrestling Star Wars" event chronology. The show, held at the Fort Worth Convention Center, drew 6,000 spectators out if its estimated 18,000 seat capacity when configured for professional wrestling shows.

Results

Thanksgiving Star Wars

Thanksgiving Star Wars (1987) was a professional wrestling supercard show that was held on November 26, 1987. The show was produced and scripted by the Dallas, Texas-based World Class Wrestling Association (WCWA) professional wrestling promotion and held in their home area, Dallas, Texas. Several matches from the show were taped for WCWA's television shows and broadcast in the weeks following the show. The show was the 30th overall show in the "Wrestling Star Wars" event chronology. The show, held at the Reunion Arena, drew 7,000 spectators out of its approximately 21,000 seat capacity.

Results

Christmas Star Wars

Christmas Star Wars (1987) was a professional wrestling supercard show that was held on December 25, 1987. The show was produced and scripted by the Dallas, Texas-based World Class Wrestling Association (WCWA) professional wrestling promotion and held in their home area, Dallas, Texas. Several matches from the show were taped for WCWA's television shows and broadcast in the weeks following the show. The show was the 31st overall show in the "Wrestling Star Wars" event chronology. The show, at the Reunion Arena, drew 2,623 spectators out of its approximately 21,000 seat capacity.

Results

References

1987 in professional wrestling
World Class Championship Wrestling shows